Joker Arroyo is a Filipina equestrian who participates in show jumping events. She is the Philippine national record holder in the Puissance Event, having cleared 1.74m with her horse Without a Doubt in 2005.

Arroyo competed at the 2005 Southeast Asian Games, winning the Team Gold Medal with Without a Doubt. Arroyo also was a member of the Philippine Team at the 2011 Southeast Asian Games, winning the Team Silver Medal with Didi de Goedereede. She was also a competitor at the 2014 Asian Games, with her horse Didi de Goedereede. She was a member of the Silver Medal-Winning Team at the 2017 Southeast Asian Games with Concept TM. Arroyo also participated in the 2018 Asian Games with Ubama Alia, and most recently won the Team Silver Medal at the 2019 Asian Equestrian Championship, again with Ubama Alia.

Arroyo graduated from Yale University in 2010, and attained a Bachelor of Arts in Political Science. Arroyo was also Captain of the Yale Equestrian Team.

Arroyo owns and operates JFJC Equestrian Training Services, and is also a member of the Board of Directors of Equestrian Philippines, Inc. 

She is the daughter of late Senator Joker Arroyo and lawyer Felicitas S. Aquino.

References

1988 births
Living people
Filipino female equestrians
Filipino dressage riders
Equestrians at the 2014 Asian Games
Yale College alumni
Southeast Asian Games gold medalists for the Philippines
Southeast Asian Games competitors for the Philippines
Southeast Asian Games silver medalists for the Philippines
Southeast Asian Games medalists in equestrian
Equestrians at the 2018 Asian Games
Competitors at the 2005 Southeast Asian Games
Competitors at the 2011 Southeast Asian Games
Asian Games competitors for the Philippines